Peykuh (also Romanized as Peykūh and Pey Kūh; also known as Pā Kūh, Pāye Kūh, Pa yi Kūh, and Peykū) is a village in Deyhuk Rural District, Deyhuk District, Tabas County, South Khorasan Province, Iran. At the 2006 census, its population was 361, in 111 families.

References 

Populated places in Tabas County